Reesville is an unincorporated community in northwestern Richland Township, Clinton County, Ohio, United States.  It has a post office with the ZIP code 45166.  It is located along State Route 72.

History
Reesville was platted in 1857 by Moses Reese, and named for him. A post office has been in operation at Reesville since 1858.

Education
Reesville is located within the East Clinton Local school district

Parks
There is a parking lot next to the Post Office for the Clinton-Fayette Friendship Trail . If you travel South on the trail you go to Melvin if you travel North you head to Sabina.

Gallery

References

Unincorporated communities in Ohio
Unincorporated communities in Clinton County, Ohio
1857 establishments in Ohio
Populated places established in 1857